Genu valgum, commonly called "knock-knee", is a condition in which the knees angle in and touch each other when the legs are straightened. Individuals with severe valgus deformities are typically unable to touch their feet together while simultaneously straightening the legs. The term originates from the Latin genu, 'knee', and valgus which means "bent outwards", but is also used to describe the distal portion of the knee joint which bends outwards and thus the proximal portion seems to be bent inwards. 

Mild genu valgum is diagnosed when a person standing upright with the feet touching also shows the knees touching. It can be seen in children from ages 2 to 5, and is often corrected naturally as children grow. The condition may continue or worsen with age, particularly when it is the result of a disease, such as rickets. Idiopathic genu valgum is a form that is either congenital or has no known cause.

Other systemic conditions may be associated, such as Schnyder crystalline corneal dystrophy, an autosomal dominant condition frequently reported with hyperlipidemia.

Causes
Genu valgum can arise from a variety of causes including nutritional, genetic, traumatic, idiopathic or physiologic and infectious.

Rickets 
Nutritional rickets is an important cause of childhood genu valgum or knock knees in some parts of the world. Nutritional rickets arises from unhealthy life style habits as insufficient exposure to sun light which is the main source of vitamin D. Insufficient dietary intake of calcium is another contributing factor. Genu valgum may arise from rickets caused by genetic abnormalities, called vitamin D-resistant rickets or X-linked hypophosphatemia.

Osteochondrodysplasia 
Osteochondrodysplasia are a variable group of genetic bone diseases or genetic skeletal dysplasias that present with generalized bone deformities involving all extremities and the spine. Genu valgum or knock knees is one of the known skeletal manifestations of Osteochondrodysplasias. A complete bone X-ray survey is mandatory to reach a definitive diagnosis.

Diagnosis 

In women, the Q angle should be less than 22 degrees with the knee in extension and less than 9 degrees with the knee in 90 degrees of flexion. In men, the Q angle should be less than 18 degrees with the knee in extension and less than 8 degrees with the knee in 90 degrees of flexion. A typical Q angle is 12 degrees for men and 17 degrees for women.

Radiography
On projectional radiography, the degree of varus or valgus deformity can be quantified by the hip-knee-ankle angle, which is an angle between the femoral mechanical axis and the center of the ankle joint. It is normally between 1.0° and 1.5° of varus in adults. Normal ranges are different in children.

Treatment
The treatment of genu valgum in children depends on the underlying cause. Developmental also known as idiopathic genu valgum is usually self-limiting and resolves during childhood. Genu valgum secondary to nutritional rickets is typically treated with lifestyle modifications in the form of adequate sun exposure to ensure receiving the daily requirements of vitamin D and nutrition with a rich calcium diet. Additionally, calcium and vitamin D supplementations may be used. If the deformity does not resolve despite the above conservative treatment and the deformity is severe and causing gait impairment, then surgery can be an option. Typically, guided growth surgery is used to straighten the deformed bone. Genu valgum arising from osteochondrodysplasia usually needs repeated guided growth surgical interventions. Genu valgum secondary to trauma depends on the degree of physical damage. Usually, limb reconstruction procedures are needed, especially if trauma occurs in the early years of life where the anticipated remaining longitudinal bone growth is great. 
 
The treatment of genu valgum in adults depends on the underlying cause and the degree of joint involvement namely arthritis. Bone corrective osteotomies and prosthetic joint replacement may be used depending upon the patient's age and symptomatology in terms of pain and functional impairment. Weight loss and substitution of high-impact for low-impact exercise can help slow progression of the condition. With every step, the patient's weight places a distortion on the knee toward a knocked knee position, and the effect is increased with increased angle or increased weight. Even in the normal knee position, the femurs function at an angle because they connect to the hip girdle at points much further apart than they connect at the knees.

Working with a physical medicine specialist such as a physiatrist, or a physiotherapist may assist a patient in learning how to improve outcomes and use the leg muscles properly to support the bone structures. Alternative or complementary treatments may include certain procedures from Iyengar Yoga or the Feldenkrais Method.

See also
 Genu varum (bow-legs)
 Genu recurvatum (back knee)
 Knee pain
 Knee osteoarthritis

References

External links 

 
 Treating knock knee - UK NHS

Medical conditions related to obesity
Congenital disorders of musculoskeletal system
Knee injuries and disorders